The Genetics Society of American Medal is a medal awarded by the Genetics Society of America (GSA) for outstanding contributions to the field of genetics in the last 15 years.

The Medal was established by society in 1981 and recognizes members who have made recent contributions to the field.

Award recipients
Source: Genetics Society of America

 2021 Douglas Koshland
 2020 Bonnie Bassler, Princeton University
 2019 Anne Villeneuve
 2018 Mariana Wolfner
 2017 David Kingsley
 2016 Detlef Weigel
 2015 Steven Henikoff
 2014 Angelika B. Amon
 2013 Elaine Ostrander
 2012 Joanne Chory
 2011 John Carlson
 2010 Barbara J. Meyer
 2009 Marian Carlson
 2008 Susan Lindquist
 2007 Shirley M. Tilghman
 2006 Victor Ambros
 2005 Stephen J. Elledge
 2004 Trudy F. Mackay
 2003 Jeffrey C. Hall
 2002 Andrew Z. Fire (Nobel Prize in Physiology or Medicine)
 2001 H. Robert Horvitz (Nobel Prize in Physiology or Medicine)
 2000 Jack W. Szostak (Nobel Prize in Physiology or Medicine)
 1999 
 1998 Ronald W. Davis
 1997 Christine Guthrie
 1996 Elliot Meyerowitz
 1995 Eric F. Wieschaus (Nobel Prize in Physiology or Medicine)
 1994 Leland H. Hartwell (Nobel Prize in Physiology or Medicine)
 1993 Jonathan R. Beckwith
 1992 Maynard V. Olson
 1991 Bruce S. Baker
 1990 Nancy Kleckner
 1989 Allan C. Spradling
 1988 David Botstein and Ira Herskowitz
 1987 Sydney Brenner (Nobel Prize in Physiology or Medicine)
 1986 Gerald Rubin
 1985 Philip Leder
 1984 David S. Hogness
 1983 Charles Yanofsky
 1982 Gerald R. Fink
 1981 Beatrice Mintz

See also

 List of genetics awards

References

Awards established in 1981
American science and technology awards
Genetics awards
1981 establishments in the United States